Sacada may refer to:

Sacada (moth), a genus of moths
Sacada, a technique in Argentine tango
 South African Chamber for Agricultural Development in Africa (SACADA)
Sacadas, Philippine plantation workers